Albert Pickles is the name of:

Albert Pickles (footballer, born 1877), for Burnley
Albert Pickles (footballer, born 1905), for Bradford City